The term Norman architecture is used to categorise styles of Romanesque architecture developed by the Normans in the various lands under their dominion or influence in the 11th and 12th centuries. In particular the term is traditionally used for English Romanesque architecture. The Normans introduced large numbers of castles and fortifications  including Norman keeps, and at the same time monasteries, abbeys, churches and cathedrals, in a style characterised by the usual Romanesque rounded arches (particularly over windows and doorways) and especially massive proportions compared to other regional variations of the style.

Origins
These Romanesque styles originated in Normandy and became widespread in northwestern Europe, particularly in England, which contributed considerable development and where the largest number of examples survived. At about the same time, a Norman dynasty that ruled in Sicily produced a distinctive variation–incorporating Byzantine and Saracen influences–also known as Norman architecture (or alternatively Sicilian Romanesque). 

The term Norman may have originated with eighteenth-century antiquarians, but its usage in a sequence of styles has been attributed to Thomas Rickman in his 1817 work An Attempt to Discriminate the Styles of English Architecture from the Conquest to the Reformation. In this work he used  the labels "Norman, Early English, Decorated, and Perpendicular". The more inclusive term romanesque was used of the Romance languages in English by 1715, and was applied to architecture of the eleventh and twelfth centuries from 1819.  

Although Edward the Confessor built the original Westminster Abbey in Romanesque style (now all replaced by later rebuildings), its construction predates the Norman Conquest: it is still believed to be the earliest major Romanesque building in England. No other significant remaining Romanesque architecture in Britain can clearly be shown to predate the Norman Conquest. However, historians believe that many surviving "Norman" elements in buildings–nearly all churches–may well in fact be Anglo-Saxon elements.

Norman arch
The Norman arch is a defining point of Norman architecture. Grand archways are designed to evoke feelings of awe and are very commonly seen as the entrance to large religious buildings such as cathedrals. Norman arches are semicircular in form. Early examples have plain, square edges; later ones are often enriched with the zig-zag and roll mouldings. The arches are supported on massive columns, generally plain and cylindrical, sometimes with spiral decoration; occasionally, square-section piers are found. Main doorways have a succession of receding semicircular arches, often decorated with mouldings, typically of chevron or zig-zag design; sometimes there is a tympanum at the back of the head of the arch, which may feature sculpture representing a Biblical scene. Norman windows are mostly small and narrow, generally of a single round-headed light; but sometimes, especially in a bell tower, divided by a shaft into two lights.

Normandy

Viking invaders arrived at the mouth of the river Seine in 911, at a time when Franks were fighting on horseback and Frankish lords were building castles. Over the next century the population of the territory ceded to the Vikings now called Normans, adopted these customs as well as Christianity and the langue d'oïl. Norman barons built timber castles on earthen mounds, beginning the development of motte-and-bailey castles, and great stone churches in the Romanesque style of the Franks. By 950, they were building stone keeps. The Normans were among the most travelled peoples of Europe, exposing them to a wide variety of cultural influences which became incorporated in their art and architecture.  They elaborated on the early Christian basilica plan. Originally longitudinal with side aisles and an apse they began to add in towers, as at the Church of Saint-Étienne at Caen, in 1067. This would eventually form a model for the larger English cathedrals some 20 years later.

England

In England, Norman nobles and bishops had influence before the Norman Conquest of 1066, and Norman influences affected late Anglo-Saxon architecture. Edward the Confessor was brought up in Normandy and in 1042 brought masons to work on the first Romanesque building in England, Westminster Abbey. In 1051 he brought in Norman knights who built "motte" castles as a defence against the Welsh. Following the invasion, Normans rapidly constructed motte-and-bailey castles along with  churches, abbeys, and more elaborate fortifications such as Norman stone keeps.

The buildings show massive proportions in simple geometries using small bands of sculpture. Paying attention to the concentrated spaces of capitals and round doorways as well as the tympanum under an arch. The "Norman arch" is the rounded, often with mouldings carved or incised onto it for decoration. chevron patterns, frequently termed "zig-zag mouldings", were a frequent signature of the Normans. The cruciform churches often had deep chancels and a square crossing tower which has remained a feature of English ecclesiastical architecture. Hundreds of parish churches were built and the great English cathedrals were founded from 1083.

After a fire damaged Canterbury Cathedral in 1174 Norman masons introduced the new Gothic architecture. Around 1191 Wells Cathedral and Lincoln Cathedral brought in the English Gothic style, and Norman became increasingly a modest style of provincial building.

Ecclesiastical architecture
Oxford Castle 1074: church tower doubles as a place of refuge
St John's Chapel (c. 1078), Tower of London
Durham Cathedral (from 1093) was the first to employ a ribbed vault system with pointed arches
Winchester Cathedral (from 1079)
Ely Cathedral (1083–1109)
Peterborough Cathedral (from 1118)
Kilpeck Church, Herefordshire
St Nicholas Church, Pyrford, Surrey (c. 1140)
Southwell Minster
St Mary the Virgin, Iffley, Oxfordshire (1170)
St Swithun's in Nately Scures, Hampshire (1175), an example of a Norman single-cell apsidal church.
Norwich Cathedral (1096–1145)
St Edward's Church (eleventh century)
St Botolph's Priory, Colchester
St John's Abbey, Colchester
Tewkesbury Abbey (c.1102)
Church of St Peter and St Paul, Trottiscliffe, Kent
St Peter's Church, Tickencote, Rutland – Norman chancel
Dunstable Priory

Bibliography
Sedding, Edmund H. (1909) Norman Architecture in Cornwall: a handbook to old ecclesiastical architecture. With over 160 plates. London: Ward & Co.

Military architecture
White Tower (Tower of London)
Rochester Castle
Norwich Castle
Colchester Castle, the largest Norman castle built and the first stone Keep in England
Hedingham Castle, Essex
Carrickfergus Castle, the best preserved Norman castle on the island of Ireland. Though it was heavily renovated, the keep, land walls and gatehouse are reasonably intact.

Domestic architecture
Jew's House, Lincoln
Boothby Pagnell Manor, Lincolnshire
Oakham Castle, Rutland
 Moyse's Hall Museum, Bury St Edmunds, Suffolk (c.1180)

Scotland
Scotland also came under early Norman influence with Norman nobles at the court of King Macbeth around 1050. His successor Máel Coluim III overthrew him with English and Norman assistance, and his queen, Margaret, encouraged the church. The Benedictine order founded a monastery at Dunfermline. Her sixth and youngest son, who became King David, built St. Margaret's Chapel at the start of the 12th century.

Ecclesiastical architecture
Dunfermline Abbey, Dunfermline (founded about 1070 by St Margaret) 
St Andrew Cathedral (from about 1070) 
St. Margaret's Chapel, Edinburgh Castle (early 12th century) 
Dalmeny parish church (from about 1130) 
St Magnus Cathedral, Kirkwall (from about 1137) 
Jedburgh Abbey, Jedburgh (founded about 1138 by David I) 
St Athernase Church, Leuchars (12th century) 
Kirkliston Parish Church, Edinburgh (late 12th century)

Ireland
The Normans first landed in Ireland in 1169. Within five years earthwork castles were springing up, and in a further five, work was beginning on some of the earliest of the great stone castles. For example, Hugh de Lacy built a Motte-and-bailey castle on the site of the present day Trim Castle, County Meath, which was attacked and burned in 1173 by the Irish king Ruaidrí Ua Conchobair. De Lacy, however, then constructed a stone castle in its place, which enclosed over three acres within its walls, and this could not be burned down by the Irish. The years between 1177 and 1310 saw the construction of some of the greatest of the Norman castles in Ireland. The Normans settled mostly in an area in the east of Ireland, later known as the Pale, and among other buildings they constructed were Swords Castle in Fingal (North County Dublin), Dublin Castle and Carrickfergus Castle in County Antrim.

Italy

Mezzogiorno
The Normans began constructing castles, their trademark architectural piece, in Italy from an early date. William Iron Arm built one at an unidentified location (Stridula) in Calabria in 1045. After the death of Robert Guiscard in 1085, the Mezzogiorno (peninsular southern Italy) experienced a series of civil wars and fell under the control of increasingly weaker princes. Revolts characterised the region until well into the twelfth century and minor lords sought to resist ducal or royal power from within their own castles. In the Molise, the Normans embarked on their most extensive castle-building programme and introduced the opus gallicum technique to Italy. Their clever use of the local stone artisans, together with the vast riches amassed from their enslaved population, made such tremendous feats possible, some as majestic as those of the ancient Roman structures they tried to emulate.

Besides the encastellation of the countryside, the Normans erected several religious buildings which still survive. They edified the shrine at Monte Sant'Angelo and built a mausoleum to the Hauteville family at Venosa. They also built many new Latin monasteries, including the famous foundation of Sant'Eufemia Lamezia. Other examples of great importance are the portal of the Shrine of Mary Queen of Anglona and the ambulatory and radiating chapels of the Aversa Cathedral.

Here is a list of Norman architecture in the Mezzogiorno : 
 Castle of Circello. 
 Castle Monforte (Campobasso).

Sicily

Sicily's Norman period lasted from circa 1061 until about 1200.  The architecture was decorated in gilded mosaics such as that at the cathedral at Monreale.  The Palatine Chapel in Palermo built in 1130 is perhaps the strongest example of this. The interior of the dome, (itself a Byzantine feature), is decorated in a mosaic depicting Christ Pantocrator accompanied by his angels.

During Sicily's later Norman era early Gothic influences can be detected such as those in the cathedral at Messina consecrated in 1197.  However, here the high Gothic campanile is of a later date and should not be confused with the early Gothic built during the Norman period; which featured pointed arches and windows rather than the flying buttresses and pinnacles later to manifest themselves in the Gothic era.

Edifices in Palermo
Norman palace with its Palatine Chapel
Zisa
Cuba
Castle of Maredolce
Cathedral of Palermo
San Giovanni dei Lebbrosi
San Giovanni degli Eremiti
Santa Maria dell'Ammiraglio also known as Martorana
San Cataldo
Church of the Holy Spirit (Sicily) also known as Chiesa del Vespro
 known as Chiesa della Magione
The Admiral's Bridge ("Ponte dell'Ammiraglio")
Monreale Cathedral and Benedictine cloister
Cefalù Cathedral
Edifices in Messina
Messina Cathedral
Church of Chiesa di Santa Maria della Valle
 Church of the Santissima Annunziata dei Catalani
Erice the Venus Castle and the main church ("Duomo dell'Assunta")
Castelvetrano, Church of the Santissima Trinità di Delia
Casalvecchio Siculo, Church of Santi Pietro e Paolo d'Agrò
Itala, the Arabic Norman Church of Saints Peter and Paul
Montalbano Elicona, Palatine Chapel
Sciacca, Church of San Nicolò la Latina and Church of Santa Maria della Raccomandata
Caltanissetta, Abbey of the Santo Spirito
San Fratello, Shrine of the Tre Santi
Bronte, Norman bridge and Castle of Nelson (old Abbey of St. Mary in Maniace)
Syracuse, Church of San Nicolò ai Cordari and Church of San Giovanni alle catacombe (St. John the Catacombs)
Nicosia (Sicily), Norman castle
Castle of Milazzo
San Marco d'Alunzio, Ruins of the Norman Church of St Saviour(S. Salvatore) and ruins of the Norman castle
Adrano, Norman castle
Aci Castello
Motta Sant'Anastasia, Norman tower (Dongione)
Caronia, Norman castle
Catania Cathedral
 Ponte dei Saraceni (Norman bridge), Adrano
 Ponte Calatrasi (Norman bridge), Roccamena
 Ponte di Cerami (Norman bridge), Cerami

Malta
After its Norman conquest in 1091, Malta saw the construction of several Norman pieces of architecture. Many have been demolished and rebuilt over the years (especially after the 1693 Sicily earthquake which destroyed many old Norman buildings), however some fortresses and houses still exist in Mdina and Vittoriosa.

Transitional style
As master masons developed the style and experimented with ways of overcoming the geometric difficulties of groin vaulted ceilings, they introduced features such as the pointed arch that were later characterised as being Gothic in style. Architectural historians and scholars consider that a style must be assessed as an integral whole rather than an aggregate of features, and while some include these developments within the Norman or Romanesque styles, others describe them as transitional or "Norman–Gothic Transitional". A few websites use the term "Norman Gothic", but it is unclear whether they refer to the transitional style or to the Norman style as a whole.

Neo-Norman

Neo-Norman architecture is a type of Romanesque Revival architecture based on Norman Romanesque architecture. There is sometimes confusion, especially in North America, between this style and revivalist versions of vernacular or later architecture of Normandy, such as the "Norman farmhouse style" popular for larger houses.

Romanesque Revival versions focus on the arch and capitals, and decorated doorways.  There are two examples in Manchester: the former Stock Exchange building and a synagogue in Fallowfield.

Gallery

See also

Norman Revival architecture
English Gothic architecture
Renaissance architecture

References

Sources and literature

External links
CRSBI (The Corpus of ROMANESQUE SCULPTURE in Britain and Ireland) website
The Normans, a European People.

 
11th-century architecture
12th-century architecture
Architectural history
Architecture